The 1999 Charity Challenge was the fifth and final edition of the professional invitational snooker tournament, which took place from 25 to 28 February 1999.

The tournament was played at the Assembly Rooms in Derby, and featured twelve professional players.

John Higgins won the title for the second time in succession, beating Ronnie O'Sullivan 9–4 in the final.

Qualifying
Four qualifying matches were played, under a best-of-nine frames format, the winners going on to play Ken Doherty, O'Sullivan, Stephen Hendry and Higgins, all of whom were seeded to the quarter-final stage.

Round 1
 Steve Davis 5–3  Peter Ebdon
 Jimmy White 5–4  John Parrott
 Marco Fu 5–3  Mark Williams
 Alan McManus 5–1  Dennis Taylor

Main draw

Final

Century breaks
137  John Higgins
118, 109  Jimmy White
113  Peter Ebdon
108, 102  Marco Fu
104  Ronnie O'Sullivan
102  Ken Doherty

References

Champions Cup (snooker)
1999 in snooker
1999 in English sport
Sport in Derby
1990s in Derby
Charity Challenge